Ohto Dam is a gravity dam located in Shimane Prefecture in Japan. The dam is used for flood control. The catchment area of the dam is 5.5 km2. The dam impounds about 3  ha of land when full and can store 239 thousand cubic meters of water. The construction of the dam was completed in 1959.

References

Dams in Shimane Prefecture
1959 establishments in Japan